Anomostomus is a genus of beetles in the family Carabidae, containing the following species:

 Anomostomus laevigatus (Kuntzen, 1919)
 Anomostomus orientalis Andrewes, 1923
 Anomostomus torridus Laferte-Senectere, 1853

References

Harpalinae